John James O'Donovan, better known as Seán O'Donovan, (15 August 1893 – 22 February 1975) was an Irish Fianna Fáil politician and veterinarian. He was a member of Seanad Éireann from 1938 to 1948, 1951 to 1954 and 1957 to 1969. He was first elected to the 2nd Seanad in 1938 by the Cultural and Educational Panel. He did not serve in the 6th or 8th Seanad. From 1951 onwards, he was nominated by the Taoiseach. He lost his seat at the 1969 Seanad election.

He was married to Kathleen Boland, the sister of Irish politicians Harry Boland and Gerald Boland.

References

1893 births
1975 deaths
Dublin inter-county hurlers
Hurling selectors
Fianna Fáil senators
Members of the 2nd Seanad
Members of the 3rd Seanad
Members of the 4th Seanad
Members of the 5th Seanad
Members of the 7th Seanad
Members of the 9th Seanad
Members of the 10th Seanad
Members of the 11th Seanad
Nominated members of Seanad Éireann